Dariusz Sęk (born 22 July 1986) is a Polish professional boxer who fights at light-heavyweight. Sęk is the last to hold the WBC Eurasia Pacific Boxing Council light heavyweight championship. He is a three-time bronze medalist of the Polish light heavyweight, including twice in the category of young riders and once in the seniors category middleweight (2007).

Professional boxing career 
Sęk made his professional debut in April 2009 defeating Kiril Psonko by UD 4 in Jarosław, Poland.

Professional boxing record

References

External links
 

Living people
1986 births
Polish male boxers
Sportspeople from Tarnów
Light-heavyweight boxers